The Air Force Falcons are the intercollegiate athletic teams that represent the United States Air Force Academy, located in Colorado Springs, Colorado. The athletics department has 17 men's and 10 women's NCAA-sanctioned teams. The current athletic director is Nathan Pine. The majority of Falcon teams compete as members of the Mountain West Conference.

Team name origin
The falcon mascot was selected by popular vote of the Academy's Class of 1959, the first class to graduate from the Academy. The team mascot is "Mach 1" name of the first falcon presented to the academy on October 5, 1955, however each performing falcon is given an individual name by its cadet falconer. The current mascot, a female white phase gyrfalcon named Nova, has been the official mascot since 2020.

Teams sponsored

As a primary member of the Mountain West Conference, the United States Air Force Academy sponsors teams in fifteen men's, nine women's, and two coed NCAA sanctioned sports. As of the current 2022–23 school year, the fencing program competes as an independent, rifle program in the Patriot Rifle Conference, gymnastics programs in the Mountain Pacific Sports Federation, ice hockey in the Atlantic Hockey, men's lacrosse program in the ASUN Conference, men's soccer and swimming & diving programs in the Western Athletic Conference, water polo in the Western Water Polo Association, and wrestling in the Big 12 Conference. Men's water polo will move to the West Coast Conference after the 2022–23 school year. Boxing is a member of the National Collegiate Boxing Association as the NCAA does not recognize boxing.

Baseball

Air Force enjoyed some success on the baseball diamond in its early years and recently, earning seven berths to the NCAA Division I playoffs (1961, 1962, 1964, 1966, 1967, 1969 and 2022). The Falcons, however, never advanced beyond the district/regional rounds. They finished as runner-up in 2000, when they lost to San Diego State in the MWC tournament championship game (which would have earned an automatic berth).

The baseball program plays home games at Falcon Baseball Field on campus.

Basketball

Men's basketball

The men's basketball team has had strong showings in the last several years, qualifying for the NCAA tournament and, most recently, making the final four of the 2007 National Invitational Tournament. The best player in Air Force history according to ESPN is Bob Beckel, who scored 50 points in a game against Arizona in 1959 and scored over 45 points on 3 other occasions. The best coach in Air Force history is Bob Spear, who coached for 15 years (1956–1971), had a career record of 177–175, and led the Falcons to two NCAA Tournament Appearances.
NCAA Tournament appearances: 1960, 1962, 2004, 2006
NIT Tournament appearances: 2007 (semifinals)
Mountain West Conference champions: 2004 Regular Season

Women's basketball

The women's basketball team competed at the Division II level in both the AIAW and NCAA between 1976 and 1996. Since then, the team has competed at the Division I level.
NCAA tournament appearances: 1985, 1990
AIAW National Tournament appearances: 1979, 1980

Boxing

The Air Force men's boxing team has had astonishing success. Led for 31 years by Coach Ed Weichers, the team has won 18 National Collegiate Boxing Association championships, and until 2009, had never finished lower than second in the nation. In 2009, the team finished third in the nation.

The women's team debuted in national-level competition during the 2015 NCBA championships. The 2017 NCBA tournament featured the first individual national boxing title for the women's team.

On November 5, 2021, the men's and women's boxing teams took part in the first-ever boxing matches held at Globe Life Field, as a pre-gameday event before the Army-Air Force football game the following day; Air Force won the matchup 6 bouts to 4.

Fencing
See: List of NCAA fencing schools

Football

Ice hockey

From 2007–2009, the men's hockey team won three straight Atlantic Hockey conference tournaments, and made three straight appearances in the NCAA Division I hockey tournament. Their 2007 appearance in the NCAA tournament was the first ever by a service academy. In the East Regional of the 2009 NCAA tournament, Air Force upset top seed Michigan 2–0, and just missed going to the Frozen Four in a 3–2 double overtime loss to Vermont.

Lacrosse

Air Force has fielded an NCAA men's lacrosse team since 1967. They appeared in the Division I Championship tournament in 1971, 1977, 1988, 2014, 2016, and 2017. The team competed in the Southern Conference as an associate member through the 2021 season and joined the ASUN Conference, also as an associate member, on July 1, 2021.

Rifle
In June, 2013, Air Force became a charter member of the Patriot Rifle Conference.

Wrestling

The Falcon wrestling team began competition in 1957 and currently competes in the Big 12 Conference (the Mountain West doesn't sponsor wrestling). In 1991 AF wrestling won the WAC championship, the first ever by any USAFA sports team. From 2006 to 2015, the Falcons had been a member of the Western Wrestling Conference (WWC), but the conference chose to disband after the 2014–15 school year when all of its members accepted an offer of single-sport membership in the Big 12. Home wrestling events are held at either the Cadet East Gym or at Clune Arena. The team is currently coached by former Olympian Joel Sharratt in his eighth season, and former national champion for the University of Iowa, under the tutelage of legendary coach Dan Gable.

Falcons Wrestling Accomplishments:

 WAC Team Championships: 1 (1991)
 All-Academy Wrestling Championships: 4 (1998, 2000, 2001, 2002)
 NCAA National Champions: 1
 NCAA All-Americans: 11
 WWC/West Regional Champions: 9
 WAC Champions: 18
 MIWA Champions: 18

Soccer (Football) 
Main article: Air Force Falcons men's soccer

The Air Force's soccer team has competed in NCAA Division I men's college soccer competitions since 1956, competing as members in the Western Athletic Conference. They are coached by Doug Hill and Assistant Coach Chris Foster, and their home matches are played at Cadet Soccer Stadium. Their best performances in the 14 NCAA Tournaments the team has qualified for have been reaching the quarterfinals in 1968 and 1993.

Notable club sports

Rugby

The Air Force rugby program was created in 1968 and began competing in college rugby in 1980. Air Force competes in the west division of the College Premier Division against rivals such as Colorado State and Wyoming. Air Force has been one of the most successful programs in college rugby. Air Force finished as one of the top 3 teams in the country 11 times from 1980–1995, including back-to-back national championships in 1989 and 1990. More recently, Air Force were national champions again in 2003 and third place in 2004. Several Air Force players have gone on to play for the US men's national rugby team.
Air Force won the 2012 Rocky Mountain 7s tournament to qualify for the 2012 USA Rugby Sevens Collegiate National Championships. Air Force also played in the 2013 USA Rugby Sevens Collegiate National Championships, reaching the quarterfinals.

Team handball

The Air Force team handball program was created in 1976. It's one of the must successful men's team handball college program in the country with 3 national titles. At the beginning they had also a women's team. They won a national title in 1988.  The Air Force men's team is one of few colleges which has won an adults national title this was in the year 1978. They biggest and longest college team handball rivalry is against the Army.

History

Athletic Directors
Here's a list of previous Athletic directors:
 Col Robert V. Whitlow, 1954–1957
 Col George B. Simler, 1957–1960
 Col Maurice L. Martin, 1960–1963
 Col Edmund A. Rafalko, 1963–1967
 Col Francis E. Merritt, 1967–1975
 Col John Clune, 1975–1991
 Col Ken Schweitzer, 1991–1996
 Col Randall Randy Spetman, 1996–2004
 Dr. Hans Mueh, 2004–2015
 Jim Knowlton, 2015–2018
 Col Jennifer Block, 2018–2019
 Nathan Pine, 2019–present

Facilities
Cadet Fieldhouse
Cadet Ice Arena (cap. 2,502) – part of the Cadet Fieldhouse
Clune Arena (cap. 5,939) – part of the Cadet Fieldhouse
 Eisenhower Golf course
Falcon Baseball Field (cap. 1,000)
Falcon Stadium (cap. 52,480)
Jacks Valley
Cadet Soccer Stadium
Cadet Lacrosse Stadium

See also
Military World Games

References

External links